Age regression in therapy is a psycho-therapeutic process that aims to facilitate access to childhood memories, thoughts, and feelings. Age regression can be induced by hypnotherapy, which is a process where patients move their focus to memories of an earlier stage of life in order to explore these memories or to access difficult aspects of their personality.

Age regression has become controversial both inside and outside of the therapeutic community, with many cases involving alleged child abuse, alien abduction, rape, and other traumatic incidents subsequently being discredited.

The notion of age regression is central to attachment therapy, whose proponents believe that a child who has missed out on their developmental stages can be made to experience those stages at a later age by a variety of techniques. Many of these techniques are intensely physical and confrontational, and include forced holding of eye contact, sometimes while being required to access traumatic memories of past neglect or abuse.  Extreme emotions such as rage or fear may be simultaneously induced.

Occasionally, 'rebirthing' has been used with tragic results. Accompanying parenting techniques may use bottle feeding and systems of complete control by the parent over the child's basic needs, including toileting and water.

Definition 

Age regression in therapy is also referred to as hypnotic age regression. This is a hypnosis technique utilized by hypnotherapists to help patients remember the perceptions and feelings caused by past events that have had an effect on their present illness. Hypnotic age regression occurs when a person is hypnotized and is instructed to recall a past event or regress to an earlier age.  The patient may then proceed to recall or relive events in their life. If the hypnotherapist suggests that the patient is of a certain age, the patient may begin to appear to talk, act, and think in ways appropriate to said age.  This allows for the patient to reinterpret their current situation with new information and insight.

Every age regression session varies based on the hypnotherapist and patient.

Purpose 
The purpose of hypnotic age regression is to reframe the negative feelings and perceptions of the past to facilitate progress towards the patient's goals. It allows patients to find the cause of their current blocks and eliminate their past traumas. When patients are hypnotized, they are in an altered state that allows for their subconscious mind to be accessed. The subconscious mind holds the behaviors and habits that people exhibit to protect them. These behaviors and habits are repeated until they are not necessary any more.  Hypnotic age regression allows for patients to reframe and purge their unnecessary behaviors.

False memories 
Whether hypnotic age regression leads to more accurate earlier memories, or if the memories are real at all, is heavily debated. The question of whether people should utilize hypnosis to recall memories of early trauma is very controversial.

Psychological research shows that interviews can be carried out in a way that people can easily acquire false memories.

Joseph Green, a professor at Ohio University, conducted a study on Hypnotherapy & false memories. In the study, 48 students who had been shown to be highly susceptible to hypnosis were divided into two groups. Before they were hypnotized, 32 of the students were warned that hypnosis could lead to false memories and could not make people remember things that they would not ordinarily remember. The remaining 16 students were not given such a warning.

Then the students were asked to select an uneventful night from the previous week -- a night they had uninterrupted sleep, uninfluenced by alcohol or drugs, and without any dreams that were recalled. During hypnosis, the students were asked if they had heard a loud noise at 4 A.M. during that night. After hypnosis, they were asked if they recalled hearing a loud noise at 4 A.M. during the night in question. Twenty-eight percent of the forewarned students and forty-four percent of those who were not warned about false memories claimed that they had heard such a noise. ''The results suggest that warnings are helpful to some extent in discouraging pseudomemories,'' Dr. Green said, adding, ''Warnings did not prevent pseudomemories and did not reduce the confidence subjects had in those memories.''

In a separate study Dr. Green conducted with the help of three students at Ohio State, 160 students were divided into three groups. One underwent self-hypnosis and another deep relaxation, while a third did counting exercises. All of them were told that the regimen would help them recall their earliest memories. Forty percent of those in the hypnosis group later recalled a memory of something that occurred on or before their first birthday. Similar recollections were reported by only 22 percent of those in the relaxation group and 13 percent in the counting group.

See also 

 Alien abduction
 Automatic writing
 Confabulation
 Confirmation bias
 Developmental stage theories
 Eyewitness testimony
 Facilitated communication
 False allegation of child sexual abuse
 False memory
 False memory syndrome
 Hypnosis
 Hypnotherapy
 Ideomotor responses to questioning in hypnotherapy
 Imagination inflation
 List of memory biases
 Lost in the mall technique
 Memory errors
 Memory implantation
 Misinformation effect
 Rape
 Recall (memory)
 Recovered-memory therapy
 Repressed memory
 Past life regression
 Regression (psychology)
 Satanic ritual abuse
 Source-monitoring error

References 

Attachment theory
Hypnosis
Psychotherapy

fr:Régression (psychanalyse)#Régression temporelle